Chen Degen is a Chinese cross-country skier who competes internationally.
 
He represented his country at the 2022 Winter Olympics.

References

Living people
2001 births
Chinese male cross-country skiers
Olympic cross-country skiers of China
Cross-country skiers at the 2022 Winter Olympics